Abudefduf natalensis, known as the Natal sergeant, is a species of damselfish in the family Pomacentridae. It is native to the tropical western Indian Ocean, where it is known from Madagascar, Mauritius, Réunion, and South Africa from KwaZulu-Natal to the Eastern Cape. Adults of the species are typically found in rocky reefs at depths of 1 to 25 m (3 to 82 ft). The species is known to be oviparous, with individuals forming distinct pairs during breeding and males guarding and aerating eggs. Abudefduf natalensis reaches 17 cm (6.7 inches) in total length.

References 

natalensis